Amanda Jamieson (born 8 May 1997) is a New Zealand professional racing cyclist who rides for Team Maaslandster Veris CCN. It was announced in November 2017 that Jamieson would continue to ride for the team in 2018.

Major results

2014
 Oceania Junior Road Championships
3rd Time Trial
5th Road race
2016
 8th National Road Race Championships
 1st Women's Tour of New Zealand
1st  Mountains classification
1st Stages 1, 2, 3 & 4
2017
 National Under–23 Road Championships
1st  Road Race
5th Time Trial
 6th Road Race, National Road Championships
2018
 2nd Rund in Fischeln
 8th Bev May Women's Tour
1st Stage 1
 10th SwissEver GP Cham-Hagendorn
2019
 8th Road Race, National Road Championships
 5th Time Trial, National Under–23 Road Championships

References

External links
 

1997 births
Living people
New Zealand female cyclists
Place of birth missing (living people)
21st-century New Zealand women